Lozier is a ghost town in Woodbury County, in the U.S. state of Iowa.

History
A post office was established at Lozier in 1880, and was discontinued in 1882. With the construction of the railroad, business activity shifted to nearby Pierson, and the town's population dwindled.

References

Geography of Woodbury County, Iowa